That's My Wife is a 1929 short comedy silent film produced by the Hal Roach Studios and starring Laurel and Hardy. It was shot in December 1928 and released March 23, 1929, by Metro-Goldwyn-Mayer with a synchronized music and sound effects track in theaters equipped for sound.

Opening title 
Mr. Hardy's house had become less and less of a home since Mr. Laurel joined the family.

Plot 
There is not even a hint of happiness in the Hardy household: by just the second shot, Mrs. Hardy, hatted, has trudged down the steps with suitcase in hand and an angry scowl on her face. She points to the source of her irritation off-camera, and in a funny pan over to the sofa, there's an empty-faced Stan sitting with a cigar in his mouth. Mrs. H is having none of her husband's attempts at conciliation — "He leaves! Or I leave!" — and after just a moment of hesitation from Ollie, she makes good on her threat. "Uncle Bernal won't leave us a dime if you go," Ollie offers, but she shows how much she cares about that by sweeping two planters off their stands and onto the floor as she pounds out the door.

And thus is set off the rest of the story. First Stan and Ollie have a round of vase smashing in the living room and Stan announces that he, too, will be leaving the premises. Then the doorbell rings — and of course it is Uncle Bernal. Some astonishingly fast sweeping conceals the evidence of the recent destructive contretemps, and Ollie greets Uncle B cordially. The two settle in on the sofa and Uncle Bernal says he wants to meet the little lady. Before Ollie can say she's not home, Stan slams a drawer upstairs and Ollie is forced to say, "I'll bring her down."

Upstairs, Ollie drafts Stan into playing the absent Magnolia and supervises his wardrobe transformation, then hurries back down to ride herd on inquisitive Uncle B, who has discovered telltale debris of planters and vases behind the sofa. Ollie paves the way for his "wife's" grand entrance by telling his uncle that "She's not much to look at — But what a clown." Said entrance is indeed grand — when "she" turns her ankle and bounces down the steps with legs widely akimbo. Bernal looks stunned after his first glimpse of his niece, but he smiles wanly when Ollie looks for approval. Out on the sofa, Stan tries to snare the cigar Bernal is offering Ollie, then Uncle offers dinner — and dancing — at The Pink Pup, and "won't take no for an answer."

At the supper club, Stan proves to be as inept a wife as he was a houseguest. When Ollie slips and pulls Stan down with him, "her" flailing attempts to get up are far removed from femininity; when her dumbbell-falsies tumble out, she has trouble staying in her chair. She does draw the gaze of a nearby drunk, as she was scratching her itchy leg in stockings, though, whose attentions turn increasingly amorous and culminate when he presents her with a centerpiece and the question: "Didn't I meet you in the fountain at Miami?" He makes himself at home at their table, tickling Stan under the chin and rubbing Uncle Bernal more and more the wrong way, until Uncle asks Ollie, "Why don't you do something forceful?" Ollie's forceful action is to turn his bowl of soup over the drunk's head and leave the bowl on top like a doughboy's tin hat. The drunk maintains his dignity: he asks for his check, and for a bowl of soup "to take out." He exits with his tuxedo soiled, his soup-bowl full, but self-esteem flying high. When Ollie commandeers Stan's soup to replace his own, a cutaway to Uncle Bernal suggests that he might be growing a little tired of his would-be heir.

Meanwhile, a dishonest waiter has been eyeing the chunky diamond pendant dangling from a posh lady diner, and when he gets the chance, he lifts it. But the maitre d' pledges to the woman's husband he'll have everyone in the place searched, and the culprit chooses Stan's back to drop the hot rock down. Stan's resultant wriggling further irritates Bernal, so The Boys adjourn to the dance floor to sort things out. But they do not have much luck there, and get caught behind a screen, then in a phone booth, then up on stage with Ollie's hands all over Stan. Watching their gyrations is too much for exasperated Uncle Bernal who stands up and announces, "I'm through! I'll leave my money to a dog and cat hospital!"

The Boys pursue him out the front door, but he leaves them in front of the club. Ollie is crestfallen: "I've lost my wife, an' my fortune — What next?" From outside the frame comes an arm and a bowl of soup, which gets overturned onto Ollie's head, leaving the bowl on top. A cut to a wider shot reveals the little drunk from inside, still wearing his bowl like a WWI helmet, while the music track plays "Over There."

In the closing two-shot, The Boys have slowly spreading smiles, and we realize what they have not lost: the friendship that will carry them through nearly fifty more short subjects and many features.

Cast

Production and exhibition 
December 1928 was a frenetic month for the Laurel and Hardy unit at Roach: they had a commitment for several films, and the studio was slated to close at the end of the month for the installation of the new sound equipment. The filming of the "minor masterpiece" Wrong Again had just wrapped on the first, and the unit would go on to wrap its landmark Big Business just after Christmas.

Leo McCarey got the "Story by" credit, although L&H Encyclopedia author Glenn Mitchell also traces some lineage back to the 1926 Roach short Along Came Auntie, with Glenn Tryon and Oliver Hardy and a writing co-credit for Stan Laurel. L&H scholar Randy Skretvedt has run down many of the "action scripts" for L&H two reelers, and the one for That's My Wife reveals a few differences between original concept and finished film. One is a sub-plot that finds the actual Magnolia Hardy at a nearby table at the Pink Pup, and she becomes the target of flirtations from Uncle Bernal. There was also an unfilmed (or unused) gag where a helium balloon tangles in Stan's wig and keeps threatening to lift it off his head.

Most significant, though, is the script-to-screen evolution of the ending. On paper, Stan was to have been searched — bodily — by a female officer in the hunt for the purloined pendant; he was to refuse the manhandling, though, and leave the club after revealing the masquerade to Uncle Bernal. Ollie was then to have informed Uncle that his real wife was the woman whom Bernal had been flirting with, and, embarrassed, Uncle would promise to pony up the inheritance — which in turn would power newfound interest by Magnolia toward her rotund hubby. "The problem with this ending," writes Skretvedt, "is that it's just too happy. Ollie still has his fortune and his wife, but he's lost Stan's friendship. In the film, he loses everything but Stan's friendship — which is more like it."

Critical reception 
Among the run of late silent shorts which constitute some of the duo's best work, That's My Wife is an unheralded entry. Pioneer Laurel & Hardy film analyst William K. Everson wrote in 1967 "Comparatively little known, this is perhaps the funniest and best of the many films in which Laurel masquerades as a woman. The single theme is handled with infinite variety throughout...." Everson's judgment, though, might be clouded by the fact that he was writing from memory in the pre-home video days; he does, after all, write that "Laurel... makes a most fetching dame...." Film critic Leslie Halliwell calls the short a "lesser-known star comedy which well sustains its basic joke and includes some splendidly timed farce in a restaurant." Glenn Mitchell added "The intricacies of balancing on high heels are matched by the task of maintaining an ersatz bosom (supplied by small barbells), but Stan convinces in the role."

References

External links 

1929 films
1929 comedy films
American LGBT-related short films
American silent short films
American black-and-white films
Films directed by Lloyd French
Laurel and Hardy (film series)
Films with screenplays by H. M. Walker
1920s LGBT-related films
Cross-dressing in film
1920s American films
Silent American comedy films